Sir Harold Bishop CBE (29 October 1900 – 22 October 1983) was a British broadcasting engineer. He was president of the Institution of Electrical Engineers for 1953-54.

He helped organize broadcasts by SHAEF. He was Chief Engineer at the BBC,
where from 1952 to 1956 his title was Director of Technical Services and from 1956 to 1963 Director of Engineering. 

He was knighted in 1955.  In 1966, he presented the Bernard Price Memorial Lecture in South Africa.

Notes

References 
 

1900 births
1983 deaths
British electrical engineers
Knights Bachelor
Alumni of the University of London
BBC people